A smuggler is a person involved in the clandestine transportation of goods or persons.

Smuggler may also refer to:

Art, entertainment, and media

Films
 Smuggler (1996 film), a 1996 Bollywood film starring Dharmendra
 Smuggler (2011 film), Japanese live-action film based on the manga
 The Smuggler (1911 film), a 1911 American silent film William Garwood, Florence La Badie, Harry Benham
The Smuggler (1912 film), French film with René Navarre
The Smuggler (2014 film), American film with James Kyson
 The Smuggler or The Mule (2014 film), alternative DVD title for 2014 Australian film 
 The Smugglers (1916 film), American silent film starring Donald Brian
 The Smugglers, US title of the British 1947 film The Man Within
 The Smugglers (1967 film) (French: Les Contrebandières), a 1967 French film
 The Smugglers (1971 film) (Italian: L'amante dell'Orsa Maggiore), 1971 Italian film

Literature
 Smuggler (comics), a fictional Marvel Comics superhero
 Smuggler (manga), a Japanese manga series by Shohei Manabe
 Smuggler (2016), the memoir of drug smuggler William Roger Reaves, who introduced Barry Seal to the Medellin Cartel
 The Smugglers (1831), novel by John Banim
The Smugglers (1913), novel by S. R. Crockett 
The Smugglers (1909), by Charles George Harper   
The Smugglers (1966), by Barbara Kimenye 
The Smugglers (1999), by Iain Lawrence 
The Smugglers (1978), by Ruth Manning-Sanders 
The Smugglers (1974), by Paul Petersen

Television
 Smuggler, a 1981 miniseries starring Oliver Tobias
The Smugglers (Doctor Who), a serial in the long-running British science fiction series Doctor Who

Other uses in arts, entertainment, and media
 The Smugglers (band), a Canadian indie rock band
 The Smugglers, an 1882 musical scored by John Philip Sousa

Other uses
Smuggler (horse), an American Champion Thoroughbred racing mare

See also
Coyote (person)
Mule (smuggling)